Tegalluar HSR Station is a large class A-type KCIC station located on Cibiru Hilir, Bandung Regency, West Java, Indonesia. Despite its name, this station is not located in Tegalluar village, but in the southeast of the village. The station, which is located at an altitude of +52,203 meters, only serves the upcoming KCIC Jakarta-Bandung route.

References 

Railway stations in West Java
Railway stations scheduled to open in 2023
Proposed rail infrastructure in Indonesia